Lehigh Valley Railroad Headquarters Building, also known as the Conrail Building, is a historic office  building located at Bethlehem, Northampton County, Pennsylvania.  It is a red brick building set on a stone masonry base.  The building was built by the Lehigh Valley Railroad in two stages; the ground through third floors were constructed in 1885-1886 and the upper floors and western wing were added in 1889–1890.  The building's style reflects Late Victorian Gothic and Queen Anne influences.  The main elevation features two copper bay windows at the corners; one three stories tall and the other one story tall.  The former office building now houses apartments.

It was added to the National Register of Historic Places in 1984.

References

Bethlehem, Pennsylvania
Commercial buildings on the National Register of Historic Places in Pennsylvania
Gothic Revival architecture in Pennsylvania
Queen Anne architecture in Pennsylvania
Office buildings completed in 1890
Buildings and structures in Northampton County, Pennsylvania
Lehigh Valley Railroad
National Register of Historic Places in Northampton County, Pennsylvania